Sylvan Lake is an all-sports, 458-acre Oakland County, Michigan lake along the main branch of the Clinton River.

To the north is 74-acre Otter Lake, which joins the 458-acre Sylvan Lake, for a total of 532 acres of lake, making it the seventh largest lake in Oakland County.

The lake lies in the city of Sylvan Lake, Michigan, in Keego Harbor, Michigan and in Waterford Township, Michigan and is west of Pontiac, Michigan.  It is located north of Orchard Lake Road, south of Voorhies Road, east of Cass Lake Road and west of Telegraph Road.

Sylvan Lake connects to 12-acre Crystal Lake downstream and to 1,280-acre Cass Lake upstream, although there is a dam between the two lakes at Cass Lake Road.

Name
Sylvan Lake was originally two lakes; Timber Lake to the north and Pickerel Lake to the south. Around the beginning of the 20th century, the names were changed to Sylvan Lake, encompassing the former two lakes into one.

The name Sylvan means "located in the woods".

Boat club
Since 1912, The Oakland County Boat Club has been on Sylvan Lake. The Oakland County Boat Club is a private, not-for-profit, social club and marina.

Fireworks have been a tradition in Sylvan Lake since the late 1940s.

Fish
Fish in Sylvan Lake include black crappie, largemouth bass, northern pike, panfish, rock bass, smallmouth bass and walleye.

References

Lakes of Oakland County, Michigan
Lakes of Michigan
Lakes of Waterford Township, Michigan